Route nationale 55 (RN 55) is a secondary highway in Madagascar, running from the intersection of RN 9 to Morombe. It crosses the region of Atsimo-Andrefana

Selected locations on route
 intersection with RN 9 
Ambahikily 
Morombe

See also
List of roads in Madagascar
Transport in Madagascar

References

Roads in Atsimo-Andrefana
Roads in Madagascar